Within the Democratic People's Republic of Korea, or North Korea, propaganda slogans play an important role in the propagation of society.

Slogans in North Korea are written onto long red signs in white writing or on large propaganda posters.

List

See also 

 Propaganda in North Korea

References 

Propaganda in North Korea
Lists of slogans
North Korea communications-related lists